Angry Lead Skies is a fantasy novel by American writer Glen Cook, the tenth book in his ongoing Garrett P.I. series. The series combines elements of mystery and fantasy as it follows the adventures of private investigator Garrett.

Plot
Garrett is a detective living in the city of TunFaire. When people have problems, they come to Garrett for help, but trouble has a way of finding him.

Garrett is at home when Playmate visits, with a kid, Kip Prose. Kip has made friends with creatures that cannot quite be described, but because of his relationship with these creatures, other parties are trying to kidnap Kip. Despite his protests, Garrett gets drawn into the mess.

While searching Playmate's stables for clues, Garrett and company are attacked by another group of indescribable assailants. Morley, Saucerhead, and Pular Singe wake Garrett and Playmate after the scuffle, but Kip Prose is gone.

Playmate and Garrett talk to Kip's family, hoping to find clues to his whereabouts. Despite some leads, Playmate and Garrett are unable to locate Kip, although they do encounter an "elf" named Casey, who assures them Kip is in no immediate danger.

When Playmate goes missing, Garrett and Pular Singe track him down, with the Roze triplets tagging along. Pular tracks the scent to Casey's apartment, where there are more mysterious elves. The trail eventually takes Garrett, Pular and the Rozes into the country outside TunFaire, where they find more of the elves, their spaceships, and an unconscious Playmate, Saucerhead Tharpe and Kip Prose. Garrett decides it is time to involve the Watch, who can hopefully clean up the mess.

Meanwhile, a ratman named John Stretch, Pular Singe's brother, attempts to kidnap Pular for his own purposes. While Garrett and John Stretch come to an agreement, Colonel Block and Deal Relway try to manage the situation with the remaining elves. Garrett strikes a deal between Kip Prose, Max Weider, and Willard Tate, in which the involved parties agree to manufacture "Three Wheels", a revolutionary new method of transportation for the citizens of TunFaire.

As a final twist, Casey escapes, thwarting the attempts of Garrett and the Watch to discover the true nature of the "silver elves". Though Relway is angry and suspicious of Garrett, Garrett is on top of the world, with his new stake in the Three Wheel business booming and the Goddamn Parrot missing in action.

Characters  
Garrett
The Dead Man
Dean
Playmate
Kip Prose
The Goddamn Parrot (Mr. Big)
Morley Dotes
Saucerhead Tharpe
Pular Singe
Colonel Westman Block
Belinda Contague
Winger
The Roze Triplets
Deal Relway
John Stretch
Tinnie Tate
Willard Tate
Max Weider

Garrett P.I.
2002 American novels
American fantasy novels